Yunnan Copper Company Limited (formerly Yunnan Smelting Plant) is the third largest copper producer in China. It was established in 1958 in Kunming, Yunnan.

Its products include copper cathode, sulfuric acid, copper rod, bare copper wire, gold, silver, platinum, palladium, selenium, tellurium, bismuth, copper sulfate and nickel sulfate.

In November 2007, Aluminum Corporation of China Limited acquired 49% of total shares of Yunnan Copper Group, Yunnan Copper Company's parent company.

References

External links
Yunnan Copper Company Limited website

Metal companies of China
Smelting
Government-owned companies of China
Companies based in Kunming
Manufacturing companies established in 1958
Non-renewable resource companies established in 1958
1958 establishments in China
Companies listed on the Shenzhen Stock Exchange